Students' Day may refer to:

 Student Day (Iran)
 Student Day (South Korea)
 Students' Day (Maharashtra)
 Tatiana Day or Students Day, Russia